Bakhtiyar Daniyaruly Bayseitov (Baqtiiar Daniiarūly Baiseiıtov; born 27 August 1952) is a Kazakh professional football coach.

Early life
Growing up in Shymkent, Kazakhstan, he practiced football everyday to his uncle Shukur's dismay. Shukur wanted him to become a teacher or scientist instead. He continued to play even after his uncle took away his ball.

Playing career
Metallurg Ordabasy, the former name of the contemporary FC Ordabasy, enlisted him in their youth system and eventually recruited him for the senior team. He was known for his goal-scoring ability. Retiring at age 33, he was in charge of the new 'Meliorator Ordabasy' in the mid-late 1980s. In the early 1990s, he became the head of FC Kairat, winning the first independent Kazakhstan Premier League in 1992.

National team
As national team manager from 1992–1993, he clinched the initiatory Central Asian Cup in 1992.

FC Ordabasy
Throughout the last two years, he was the manager of FC Ordabasy.  Following a turbulent period as coach, he became their president instead, giving the coach position to Aleksei Petrushin. While he was with Ordabasy, he was accused of being involved in heinous situations and match-fixing allegations, which diminished his reputation with the fans.

References

External links
 
 
 

Soviet footballers
Kazakhstani footballers
FC Ordabasy players
FC Ordabasy managers
1952 births
Living people
People from Shymkent
Kazakhstan national football team managers
Association football forwards
Kazakhstani football managers
Kazakhstan international footballers